The list of Northern Illinois University people includes notable alumni, non-graduates, faculty and staff, chief executives, and affiliates of the Northern Illinois University.

Notable alumni

Academe

 Jerry M. Anderson (M.S. 1959), 9th President of Ball State University 
 Gregg Andrews (Ph.D. 1988), labor historian and Distinguished Professor Emeritus at Texas State University
 Judith Curry (B.S. 1974, Ph.D. 1982), climatologist
 Jose Manuel Diokno (J.D. 1986), founding Dean of the De La Salle University College of Law in Malate, Manila, Philippines
 John Dunn (B.A. 1967, M.A. 1969), President of Western Michigan University
 Kevin Folta, professor and chairman of the horticultural science department at the University of Florida
 Michael Honey, Guggenheim Fellow and Haley Professor of Humanities at the University of Washington Tacoma
 Louise Huffman (M.S. 1979), teacher and educator on US Antarctic programs
 Randy Kryn (B.S. 1973), Civil Rights Movement historian
 Thomas Lindsay (B.A. 1977, M.A. 1983), president of Shimer College
 Timothy P. Marshall (B.S. 1978), meteorologist and civil engineer, damage analysis expert
 Professor Thomas J. Near (B.A., B.S., 1993; M.S. 1995), evolutionary biologist, Professor of Ecology and Evolutionary Biology, 18th head of Saybrook College at Yale University
 Vice Admiral Ann Rondeau USN, Retired (Ed.D.), past President of College of DuPage, past President of National Defense University
 Dr. Christopher J. Schneider (M.A. 2004), professor at Wilfrid Laurier University
 Paul Sereno, paleontologist, University of Chicago, B.S., Biology, 1979 
 Bharath Sriraman, academic editor, professor of mathematics at The University of Montana (M.S. 1999, Ph.D. 2002)

Arts and entertainment

 Joan Allen, 1980, actress, Academy Award nominee and Tony Award winner, The Contender, The Bourne Supremacy, Nixon, Face/Off, The Upside of Anger 
 Dan Castellaneta, 1979, Emmy Award-winning actor, voice of "Homer Simpson" and others on The Simpsons
 Jimmy Chamberlin, drummer of The Smashing Pumpkins
 Mike Disa, film director, screenwriter, animator (Pocahontas, Hercules, Tarzan and Atlantis: The Lost Empire)
 Charlotte Kate Fox, actress and first non-Japanese heroine of an NHK Asadora: the series Massan broadcast on Japanese television; earned her Master of Fine Arts at NIU
 Brian Godawa, screenwriter and author
 Steve Harris, 1989, actor, Emmy Award nominee, The Practice 
 Wood Harris, actor, Remember the Titans and The Wire 
 E. E. Knight, 1987, author of Vampire Earth series, Age of Fire series
 Sebastian Maniscalco, stand-up comedian (The Late Late Show, Comedians in Cars Getting Coffee)
 Justin Mentell, 2005, actor, Boston Legal
 Joe Minoso, actor, Boss and Chicago Fire
 Nicole Mitchell, musician and composer
 Cindy Morgan, actress, Lacy Underall in Caddyshack, Lora and Yori in TRON
 Matthew Prozialeck, blues musician, harmonica player
 Brian Simpson, smooth jazz pianist and composer
 Jason Matthew Smith, actor who portrays Ensign Hendorff in Star Trek, Star Trek Into Darkness and Star Trek Beyond
 Carrie Snodgress, Oscar-nominated actress (Diary of a Mad Housewife, Pale Rider, The Forsaken, Phantom 2040)
 Kurt Sutter, actor, writer, producer, Sons of Anarchy and The Shield
 Freida High Washongo Tesfagiorgis, artist and art historian 
 Doug Walker, YouTube personality known for web show Nostalgia Critic
 Matt Walsh, comedian and actor (Old School, Role Models, The Hangover); portrays Mike McLintock on Veep 
 Patricia Wood, author of Lottery; attended NIU
 Barbara Alyn Woods, actress, One Tree Hill
 Robert Zemeckis, director, Back to the Future, Who Framed Roger Rabbit and Forrest Gump; attended NIU before enrolling in film study at University of Southern California

Media

 Terry Boers, 1972, co-host of Boers and Bernstein, 670AM WSCR Chicago; former Chicago Sun-Times sports columnist
 Nicole Briscoe, anchor for ESPN's SportsCenter
 Paul Ladewski, member of the Baseball Writers' Association of America, voter in the annual National Baseball Hall of Fame election, former Daily Southtown (Chicago) and The San Francisco Examiner sports columnist-editor, Inside Sports magazine contributing editor 
 T.J. Simers, former Los Angeles Times sportswriter
 Dalton Tanonaka, journalist and television executive, earned B.Sc. in journalism at NIU in 1977

Business

 Jeff Aronin, founder of Ovation Pharmaceuticals
 Allan Cox, author and business leader
 Ralph de la Vega, CEO of AT&T Mobility
 John Sall, co-founder of the SAS Institute and member of the Forbes 400

Athletics

American football

 Chad Beebe, wide receiver for Minnesota Vikings
 Ken Bishop, defensive tackle for Dallas Cowboys
 Christian Blake, wide receiver for Atlanta Falcons
 George Bork, quarterback for NIU 1962-63, first NCAA player to pass for more than 3,000 yards, College Football Hall of Fame
 Joel Bouagnon, running back for Chicago Bears and Green Bay Packers
 Larry Brink, NFL defensive lineman, two-time Pro Bowler
 Da'Ron Brown, wide receiver for Kansas City Chiefs
 Brad Cieslak, NFL tight end for Buffalo Bills and Cleveland Browns 
 Ryan Diem, NFL offensive tackle for Indianapolis Colts 
 Larry English, NFL defensive end/linebacker for San Diego Chargers and Tampa Bay Buccaneers; #16 pick in NFL Draft, highest ever by a NIU player 
 P. J. Fleck, head football coach at the University of Minnesota, former NFL wide receiver for San Francisco 49ers 
 Doug Free, NFL offensive tackle for Dallas Cowboys 
 Kenny Golladay, wide receiver for New York Giants
 Thomas Hammock, head football coach at NIU; former assistant coach for Baltimore Ravens (NFL) and Wisconsin Badgers 
 Chandler Harnish, NFL quarterback for Indianapolis Colts, MVP of 2010 Humanitarian Bowl victory 
 Duane Hawthorne, NFL cornerback for Dallas Cowboys 
 Jack Heflin, defensive end for Green Bay Packers
 Darrell Hill, NFL wide receiver for Kansas City Chiefs, Tennessee Titans 
 Sam Hurd, NFL wide receiver for Dallas Cowboys and Chicago Bears 
 LeShon Johnson, NFL running back, 1994 
 Scott Kellar, nose tackle for Indianapolis Colts, Green Bay Packers, and Minnesota Vikings
 Jerry Kurz, president of Arena Football League
 Tommylee Lewis, wide receiver for New Orleans Saints and Detroit Lions
 Jordan Lynch, quarterback for Chicago Bears, Edmonton Eskimos of CFL, 2015 Grey Cup champion, 2015; third in 2013 Heisman Trophy voting (highest ever by NIU player)
 Justin McCareins, NFL wide receiver for Tennessee Titans and New York Jets 
 Rashaan Melvin, cornerback for Tampa Bay Buccaneers, Baltimore Ravens, New England Patriots, Indianapolis Colts, Oakland Raiders and Detroit Lions
 Jake Nordin, NFL tight end/fullback for Baltimore Ravens and Detroit Lions 
 Patricia Palinkas, first woman to play professional football, placekick holder in Atlantic Coast Football League for Orlando Panthers, attended NIU but did not play football
 Nathan Palmer, NFL wide receiver for Indianapolis Colts, Denver Broncos, Miami Dolphins, Chicago Bears, San Francisco 49ers and Denver Broncos
 Todd Peat, NFL guard for St. Louis Cardinals and Los Angeles Raiders 
 David Petway, NFL defensive back for Green Bay Packers 
 Max Scharping, NFL offensive tackle for Houston Texans
 Chad Spann, NFL running back for Pittsburgh Steelers and Houston Texans 
 John Spilis, NFL wide receiver for Green Bay Packers 
 Sutton Smith, NFL linebacker for Pittsburgh Steelers
 Hollis Thomas, NFL defensive tackle for Philadelphia Eagles, New Orleans Saints and Carolina Panthers 
 Michael Turner, NFL running back for Atlanta Falcons
 Tim Tyrrell, NFL running back for Atlanta Falcons, St. Louis Rams and Pittsburgh Steelers 
 Clarence Vaughn, defensive back for Washington Redskins, two-time Super Bowl champion, NIU Hall of Famer
 Jimmie Ward, safety for San Francisco 49ers
 Scott Wedige, NFL center for Arizona Cardinals
 Tom Wittum, NFL punter for San Francisco 49ers 
 Garrett Wolfe, NFL running back for Chicago Bears, for Omaha Nighthawks of United Football League and Montreal Alouettes of Canadian Football League

Baseball

 Ned Colletti, former MLB general manager and current analyst for Los Angeles Dodgers
 Davy Jones, MLB player
 Fritz Peterson, MLB pitcher with New York Yankees 
 Tom Tennant, MLB player with the St. Louis Browns 
 Larry Young, former MLB umpire

Basketball

 Kenny Battle, former NBA player 
 Jim Bradley, former ABA player 
 Paul Dawkins, former NBA player 
 Billy Harris, former ABA player 
 Richard Oruche, player for Nigerian national team, 2012 Olympic Games and for NIU until transfer to University of Illinois Springfield
 Xavier Silas, NBA player for Washington Wizards, Philadelphia 76ers and Boston Celtics 
 Donald Whiteside, former NBA player 
 Bob Wood, former NBA player

Professional wrestling

 Brad Bradley, wrestler, B.A. History, 2004
 Maria Kanellis, wrestler and valet 
 Marty Lurie, professional wrestling manager and announcer, B.A., Political Science, 1995

Other

 Curtis Blaydes (attended), professional mixed martial artist, UFC heavyweight contender
 Aimee Boorman, head coach of U.S. women gymnastics team at 2016 Summer Olympics, attended NIU for a year before leaving to coach
 Farell Duclair, Canadian football player, transferred from Vanier College to play for Northern Illinois Huskies
 Tim Gullikson, professional tennis player
 Tom Gullikson, professional tennis player
 Ken Henry, speed skater and gold medalist at the 1952 Winter Olympics
 Terry Martin, professional MMA fighter; B.A., Psychology, 2004

Politics and government

Federal government

 Don Bacon, Republican Congressman from Nebraska's 2nd congressional district and retired United States Air Force Brigadier General
 Tammy Duckworth, U.S. Senator from Illinois; previously served as a Congresswoman, representing Illinois's 8th congressional district, 2013–2017; was a Ph.D. candidate at NIU
 Dennis Hastert, Republican U.S. Congressman 1987–2008; longest-serving Republican Speaker of the House; M.S., Education, 1967 
 Robin Kelly, Democratic Congresswoman from Illinois's 2nd congressional district, earned Ph.D. at NIU
 Andrew L. Traver, civilian Director of the Naval Criminal Investigative Service
 W. Willard Wirtz, United States Secretary of Labor during Kennedy administration and Johnson administration, took classes at NIU (then Northern Illinois State Teachers College), member of Alpha Phi Omega chapter; graduated from Beloit College

State legislators

Colorado
 John Buckner, Democratic member of the Colorado House of Representatives, representing the 40th district from 2012 until his death in 2015

Florida
 Bill Heller, Democratic member of the Florida House of Representatives, representing the 52nd district 2007–2011

Illinois
 Steven Andersson, Republican member of the Illinois House of Representatives since 2015 
 Ralph C. Capparelli, Democratic member of the Illinois House of Representatives, 1971–2004
 Cristina Castro, Democratic member of the Illinois since 2017; earned her Bachelor of Science and master of business administration at NIU
 Annazette Collins, Democratic member of the Illinois State Senate, representing the 5th district, 2011–2013; served in the Illinois House of Representatives, representing the 10th District, 2001–2011
 John Curran, Republican member of the Illinois Senate since 2017
 Joe Dunn, Republican member of the Illinois House of Representatives, 2003–2009 
 Roger L. Eddy, Republican member of the Illinois House of Representatives, 2003–2012 
 Beverly Fawell, Republican member of the Illinois House of Representatives (1981–1983) and the Illinois Senate (1983–1999)
 Gene L. Hoffman, Republican member of the Illinois House of Representatives, 1967–1991; earned his master's and doctorate degrees from NIU
 Joyce Holmberg, Democratic member of the Illinois Senate, 1983–1993
 Toi Hutchinson, Democratic member of the Illinois Senate since 2009 
 Christine J. Johnson, Republican member of the Illinois Senate, 2011–2013 
 Wendell E. Jones, Republican member of the Illinois Senate, 1998–2007
 Jeremiah E. Joyce, Democratic member of the Illinois Senate, 1979–1993; served as a member of the NIU Board of Trustees
 Doris Karpiel, Republican member of the Illinois Senate, 1984–2003; served in the Illinois House of Representatives, 1979–1984; earned her B.A. in political science from NIU
 Nancy Kaszak, Democratic member of the Illinois House of Representatives, 1993–1997
 Stephanie Kifowit, Democratic member of the Illinois House of Representatives, representing the 84th district since 2013 
 Anna Moeller, Democratic member of the Illinois House of Representatives representing the 43rd district since 2014
 Bob Morgan, Democratic member of the Illinois House of Representatives representing the 58th district as of 2019
 Ruth Munson, Republican member of the Illinois House of Representatives, 2002–2009
 Vincent Persico, Republican member of the Illinois House of Representatives, 1991–2002; earned his masters of education at NIU in 1986
 Tom Rooney, Republican member of the Illinois Senate appointed in 2016; earned his M.P.A. from NIU in 2011
 Michael V. Rotello, Democratic member of the Illinois House of Representatives 1991–1995; earned his Bachelor of Arts and did public administration graduate work at NIU
 Kathleen A. Ryg, Democratic member of the Illinois House of Representatives, 2003–2009
 Jack Schaffer, Republican member of the Illinois Senate, 1973–1999
 George Scully, Jr., Democratic member of the Illinois House of Representatives, 1997–2009
 Joe Sosnowski, Republican member of the Illinois House of Representatives since 2011 
 Litesa Wallace, Democratic member of the Illinois House of Representatives since 2014
 Pennie Von Bergen Wessels, Democratic member of the Illinois House of Representatives, 1993–1995
 Lance Yednock, Democratic member of the Illinois House of Representatives, 2019–present

Indiana
 Lonnie Randolph, Democratic member of the Indiana Senate representing the 2nd district since 2008

Iowa
 David Hartsuch, Republican member of the Iowa Senate, representing the 41st District, 2007–2011

Maryland
 Michael D. Smigiel, Sr., Republican delegate in the Maryland House of Delegates, 2003–2015

Michigan
 John Olumba, Democratic turned Independent member of the Michigan House of Representatives, 2011–2015

Montana
 Tim Furey, Democratic member of the Montana House of Representatives, representing the 91st district, 2007–2011

New Hampshire
 Susan M. Ford, Democratic member of the New Hampshire House of Representatives, representing Grafton's 3rd district since 2013
 Jay Kahn, Democratic member of the New Hampshire Senate since December 2016
 Peter B. Schmidt, Democratic member of the New Hampshire House of Representatives, representing Grafton's 3rd district since 2013

New York
 Patricia Fahy, Democratic member of the New York State Assembly, representing the 109th district since 2013
 James E. Powers, Democratic member of the New York State Assembly, 1965–1966, and the New York State Senate, 1967–1972

Oregon
 Ron Maurer, Republican member of the Oregon House of Representatives, 2007–2011; candidate for Oregon Superintendent of Public Instruction, 2010

Virginia
 John Miller, Democratic member of the Virginia Senate from January 2008 until his death in April 2016

Wisconsin
 Tim Cullen, Democratic member of the Wisconsin Senate who served two non-consecutive tenures, 1975–1989 and 2011–2015
 Dave Heaton, Republican member of the Wisconsin House of Representatives since 2015
 Jacob Leicht, Progressive member of the Wisconsin State Assembly, 1925–1927
 James A. Wright, Republican member of the Wisconsin State Assembly from 1905 until his death in 1911; attended the university when it was Northern Illinois State Normal School

Local officeholders
Timothy Hogan Lombard Park District Commissioner 1989-1995 President 1993-1995
 John Arena, Alderman for Chicago's 45th ward since 2011
 Howard Brookins Jr., Alderman for Chicago's 21st ward since 2003
 Steve Chirico, Mayor of Naperville, Illinois since 2015
 Franco Coladipietro, Mayor of Bloomingdale, Illinois; member of the Illinois House of Representatives, 2005–2013
 Robert Fioretti, former Alderman for the 2nd Ward; candidate for mayor of Chicago in 2015
 Terry Gabinski, member of the Chicago City Council from the 32nd ward, 1969–1998
 James Laski, former City Clerk of Chicago, controversial talk radio host, and author of Fall From Grace — From City Hall to Prison Walls; graduated from Northern Illinois University College of Law in 1978
 Bill Morris, Mayor of Waukegan, Illinois, 1977–1985
 Ricardo Muñoz, Chicago 22nd Ward Alderman since 1993
 William E. Peterson, Vernon Township Supervisor, 1977–2017; served in the Illinois General Assembly, 1983–2009

Judiciary

 Sharon J. Coleman, jurist, presidential nominee for the United States District Court for the Northern District of Illinois 
 James Leon Holmes, federal judge on the United States District Court for the Eastern District of Arkansas since 2004
 Thomas W. Murphy, Cook County Circuit Court judge since 2006; Chicago alderman of the 18th ward, 1991–2006

Activists

 Markos Moulitsas, founder of the Daily Kos blog; B.A., Journalism, Political Science, B.A. Philosophy 1996
 James F. Phillips, teacher and environmentalist who led a campaign against water pollution caused by Armour and Company
 Steven Schafersman, President of Texas Citizens for Science (B.S., 1971, Geology and Biology; M.S., 1973, Geology)

International figures

 Anies Baswedan, political party; earned his Ph.D. in political science from NIU
 Andi Mallarangeng, former Minister of Youth and Sports of Indonesia
 Audley Shaw, Minister of Finance and the Public Service of Jamaica and Member of Parliament for Manchester North Eastern
Panitan Wattanayagorn, former Deputy Secretary-General to the Prime Minister of Thailand, and acting Spokesman of the Royal Thai Government 
  Wu Jun, Vice Mayor of Guiyang, the provincial capital of Guizhou, April 2013 to September 2014; studied at NIU

 Aldo Rodriguez, Fulbright and Director of Language Policies for ANEP in Uruguay; earned his PhD in Educational Psychology from Northern Illinois University in 2018.

Presidents of Northern Illinois University
 Lisa C. Freeman, 2017–present
 Douglas D. Baker, 2013–2017
 John G. Peters, 2000–2013
 John E. La Tourette, 1986–2000
 Clyde Wingfield, 1985–1986
 William R. Monat, 1978–1984
 Richard J. Nelson, 1971–1978
 Rhoten A. Smith, 1967–1971
 Leslie A. Holmes, 1949–1967
 Karl Langdon Adams, 1929–1948
 Joseph Clifton Brown, 1927–1929
 J. Stanley Brown, 1919–1927
 John Williston Cook, 1899–1919

Notable faculty and staff

Academics

 Gülşat Aygen PhD, MA, BA, professor of linguistics at NIU, Harvard University alumnae, theoretic linguist, has translated many Turkic texts, and published author 
 Michael Bakalis, served as an Assistant Professor of History and later as Assistant Dean prior to his election as Illinois Superintendent of Public Instruction
 Josephine Thorndike Berry (1871-1945), Professor of Domestic Science, Northern Illinois State Normal School
 John W. Darrah, judge of the United States District Court for the Northern District of Illinois; served as an adjunct at the Northern Illinois University College of Law
 P. Allan Dionisopoulos, professor of political science; political scientist and legal scholar quoted in multiple Supreme Court of the United States decisions
 Mark Emmert, President of the National Collegiate Athletic Association; professor of political science at NIU, 1983–1985 
 Mike Fortner, Republican member of the Illinois House of Representatives from the 49th district, 2007–2019; currently teaches physics at NIU
 Fareed Haque, Professor of Jazz and Classical Guitar Studies
 Han Kuo-Huang, former professor of music 
 Romualdas Kasuba (Ph.D. 1962), engineer, academician, co-founder of the College of Engineering and Engineering Technology 
 Michael J. Kolb, associate professor of anthropology 
 Vernon Lattin (born 1938), president of Brooklyn College
 Lynne M. Thomas, three-time Hugo Award-winning editor; head of rare books and special collections
 George L. Trager, linguist
Thomas C. Wiegele, professor of political science; founder of Association for Politics and the Life Sciences

Athletics

 Rod Carey, head coach for football (2012–2019) 
 Lee Corso, head coach for football (1984)
 Dave Doeren, former head coach for football (2010–2012) 
 Lindsey Durlacher, wrestling coach 
 Marci Jobson, former head coach for women's soccer 
 Jerry Kill, former head coach for football (2008–2010) 
 Mark Montgomery, head coach for men's basketball (2011–2021) 
 Joe Novak, former head coach for football (1996–2007) 
 Ricardo Patton, former head coach for men's basketball (2007–2011)

References

Northern Illinois University people